Merkenstraße is a through station on the Hamburg U-Bahn line U2. The underground rapid transit station is located in the Hamburg district of Billstedt, Germany. Billstedt is part of the borough of Hamburg-Mitte.

The station was opened in 1970, and − until 1990 − was terminus station of line U3.

Layout
Merkenstraße is located on Möllner Landstraße. The station has one island platform, with one entrance each on both ends of the platform.

Service

Trains
Merkenstraße U-Bahn station is served by Hamburg U-Bahn line U2; departures are every 10 minutes.

See also 

 List of Hamburg U-Bahn stations

References

External links 

 Line and route network plans by hvv.de 
 100 Jahre Hochbahn by hochbahn.de 

Hamburg U-Bahn stations in Hamburg
U2 (Hamburg U-Bahn) stations
Buildings and structures in Hamburg-Mitte
Railway stations in Germany opened in 1970
1970 establishments in West Germany